"Remember the Nights" is a song by American new wave band The Motels, which was released in 1983 as the second single from their fourth studio album Little Robbers. The song was written by Martha Davis and Scott Thurston, and produced by Val Garay. "Remember the Nights" peaked at number 36 on the US Billboard Hot 100.

Music video
The song's music video was directed by Val Garay and produced by Tony Basile. It achieved heavy rotation on MTV.

Critical reception
On its release, Billboard listed the song as one of their "Pop picks" and wrote, "Still torchy and dramatic, but the beat is peppier than in 'Suddenly Last Summer'." Cash Box felt the song took a "tougher stance" in comparison to the band's previous chart successes. They noted that it "recalls the band's earlier rock sound" and added that Davis "nearly steps into Pat Benatar territory". They considered the "tight arrangement and cool saxophone" to make the song a "Top 10 natural" and also noted that "faint synths provide an airy touch".

Track listing
7–inch single
"Remember the Nights" – 3:05
"Killing Time" – 3:37

7–inch single (Brazil)
"Remember the Nights" – 3:05
"Suddenly Last Summer" – 3:45

7–inch promotional single (US)
"Remember the Nights" – 3:05
"Remember the Nights" – 3:05

12–inch promotional single (US)
"Remember the Nights" – 3:11
"Remember the Nights" – 3:11

Personnel
Credits are adapted from the Little Robbers LP inner sleeve notes and 7-inch single sleeve notes.

The Motels
 Martha Davis – vocals
 Marty Jourard – keyboards, saxophone
 Michael Goodroe – bass
 Brian Glascock – drums
 Guy Perry – guitar
 Scott Thurston – keyboards, guitar

Production
 Val Garay – producer

Charts

References

1983 songs
1983 singles
The Motels songs
Capitol Records singles
Songs written by Martha Davis (musician)
Song recordings produced by Val Garay